Touro is a municipality of northwestern Spain in the province of A Coruña, in the autonomous community of Galicia. It has a population of 4,082 inhabitants (INE, 2011). Touro has an area of 15.34 km2.

References

Municipalities in the Province of A Coruña